Ronald Caldwell is an American politician and businessman. A Republican, he has served three term in the Arkansas Senate representing District 10 (previously District 23); he was first elected in November 2012 and most recently in 2020. Caldwell is the chairman of the Senate Committee on State Agencies and Governmental Affairs and a member of several other committees.

He was born in Wynne, Arkansas. He graduated from Arkansas State University with a bachelor's degree in marketing. In December 2018, he broke his hip riding a horse.

References

External links
 Ballotpedia entry

Republican Party Arkansas state senators
People from Wynne, Arkansas
Arkansas State University alumni
Year of birth missing (living people)
Living people